The Dorsey Mountains are a mountain range just east of Somigliana Glacier in the northern part of the Arrowsmith Peninsula in Graham Land. They were mapped by the Falkland Islands Dependencies Survey (FIDS) from surveys and air photos in 1956 to 1959 and named by the UK Antarctic Place-Names Committee (UK-APC) for Noah Ernest Dorsey, an American physicist.

Vanni Peak was named by UK-APC for Manfredo Vanni, an Italian hydrologist and glaciologist. It was named by UK-APC for Max Lagally, a German mathematician and glaciologist.

References 

Mountain ranges of Graham Land
Loubet Coast